The Sultan Azlan Shah Bridge or Jambatan Sultan Azlan Shah is the longest river-crossing bridge in the North–South Expressway network. The bridge crosses Perak River in Perak, Malaysia, spanning 360 metres. It was officially opened on 17 September 1987 by the late Almarhum Sultan Azlan Shah of Perak in conjunction with the opening of the Ipoh North–Changkat Jering sections of the North–South Expressway Northern Route. Near the bridges is the Sungai Perak rest and service area.

Bridges completed in 1987
Bridges in Perak